Lasin may refer to:

Łasin, a town in Kuyavian-Pomeranian Voivodeship, Poland
Lasin, Chipwi, a settlement in Chipwi Township, Kachin State, Burma